Westonia is a small town located in the eastern Wheatbelt region of Western Australia, 10 kilometres (6 mi) north of the Great Eastern Highway. It is the main town in the Shire of Westonia.

History
Westonia came into existence with the discovery in 1910 of gold in the area, by a sandalwood cutter named Alfred Weston (17 May 1876 - 26 September 1924). Initially the area was known as Weston's Reward and later as Westons. By 1915 there were two major mines in the area, and the population was in excess of 500. By 1917 the area, by then known as Westonia, had a population of more than 2,000. In 1919, low gold prices forced the closure of the mines, and many people left the area. Westonia was gazetted as a town in February 1926. In 1935 one of the mines reopened, but closed again in 1948, only to be reopened in 1985. The mine then closed once again in 1991. In mid-2009, it was announced that mining would once again commence at Westonia's Edna May Gold Mine, with the first gold pour anticipated for May 2010, coinciding with the centenary of the discovery of gold in the district.

In October 2009, Westonia won the Tidy Towns - Sustainable Communities competition for the central Wheatbelt region. Westonia won the same title in October 2010, and was also declared the state winner in November 2010.

Things to see
Westonia Historic Townsite
Wolfram Street Facades
Westonia Caravan Park
Westonia Common
Boodalin Soak
Elachbutting Rock
Yanneymooning Reserve
Baladjie Rock
Edna May Gold Mine

References

External links
Shire of Westonia

Towns in Western Australia
Mining towns in Western Australia
Shire of Westonia